The 1956 World Table Tennis Championships were held in Tokyo from April 2 to April 11, 1956.

Medalists

Team

Individual

References

External links
ITTF Museum

 
World Table Tennis Championships
World Table Tennis Championships
World Table Tennis Championships
Table tennis competitions in Japan
International sports competitions hosted by Japan
World Table Tennis Championships
Sports competitions in Tokyo
World Table Tennis Championships